Doctor at Large may refer to:

 Doctor at Large (novel), a 1955 novel by Richard Gordon
 Doctor at Large (film), a 1957 British comedy film
 Doctor at Large (TV series), a 1971 British television comedy series based on a set of books by Richard Gordon